Łaszewo may refer to:

Łaszewo, Brodnica County in Kuyavian-Pomeranian Voivodeship (north-central Poland)
Łaszewo, Świecie County in Kuyavian-Pomeranian Voivodeship (north-central Poland)
Łaszewo, Masovian Voivodeship (east-central Poland)
Łaszewo, West Pomeranian Voivodeship (north-west Poland)

See also
Łaszewo-Wietrznik in Żuromin County, Masovian Voivodeship, in east-central Poland